Ibillo is one of the largest town situated in the Akoko-Edo local government area in Edo State in Nigeria. Ibillo is surrounded by several neighboring towns/villages including Ikiran Oke, Imoga, Ekpesa and Lampese which are all part of the Twenty two communities said to make up the Okpameri group, all within the Akoko Edo local government area with the LGA headquarters in Igarra.

History
Very little is documented about the origin of the people of Ibillo, but, in oral tradition, it is believed that the people migrated from Benin kingdom. The people engage in such occupations as farming, trading, wood processing and pottery. The land is fertile and she has a large market relative to other Akoko-Edo communities. The market is located along Ibillo – Abuja express way. Ibillo has four quarters and rulership is rotated among those quarters.

References

Populated places in Edo State